is a Japanese former Nippon Professional Baseball pitcher.

See also 
 List of top Nippon Professional Baseball strikeout pitchers

References

External links

1966 births
Living people
People from Asahikawa
Japanese baseball players
Nippon Professional Baseball pitchers
Hankyu Braves players
Orix Braves players
Orix BlueWave players
Hanshin Tigers players
Japanese baseball coaches
Nippon Professional Baseball coaches